New Alliance Records was an independent record label founded by American musicians D. Boon and Mike Watt (of The Minutemen) and longtime friend and associate Martin Tamburovich. They were inspired by the example of their friends in southern California band Black Flag who had earlier formed SST Records. The existence of SST led Watt to understand, according to a 1987 interview he gave to Musician magazine, how easy it was to get a record made: "All you had to do was pay the record plant man."

The label's first release was the 1980 various-artist compilation Cracks in the Sidewalk, which included tracks by the Minutemen, Black Flag, and Saccharine Trust. Other early releases on New Alliance included Hüsker Dü's first album Land Speed Record and the Minutemen's second-ever release, the seven-inch EP Joy. Eventually the label grew to nurture the early career of the Descendents, issue additional compilation albums (Chunks and Mighty Feeble), and release other recordings by the Minutemen (The Politics of Time), Secret Hate (Vegetables Dancing), and Hüsker Dü (the In a Free Land EP).  The label also showcased a number of post-punk bands from the South Bay area of southern California, notably Slovenly,  Phantom Opera, and Invisiblechains.

After D. Boon's car-accident death in 1985 and the increasingly busier schedule of Watt's post-Minutemen band Firehose, Watt and Tamburovich sold New Alliance to SST in 1987.  Greg Ginn, SST's owner and Black Flag's guitarist, proceeded to transfer all of the Minutemen and Descendents back catalog and Hüsker Dü's Land Speed Record to SST and turned New Alliance into a subsidiary label of SST that concentrated on more adventurous and non-mainstream records, including jazz, instrumental, poetry, and spoken-word releases. New Alliance also released the debut single of Ciccone Youth and material from The Coachmen, both of which were Sonic Youth-related projects.

New Alliance ceased its operations in 1998 in order to save money. Its back-catalog has been deleted, its releases are no longer available through SST Records, and there is no mention of the label or its artists on SST's website.

Label co-founder Tamburovich died of a bacterial infection in 2003.

Rapp Records founder Rad Ramsey & Martin Tamburovich reactivated New Alliance in 2000 as a Rapp Records sublabel. It also brought back its back-catalog. This time it was specialized for Rap, Rock & Reissuing its old material. However, in 2006, SST filed a case against Rapp & forced Ramsey to close down New Alliance.

See also
List of record labels

References

External links
Discogs.com (partial discography)
Rate Your Music.com (partial discography from 1980 to 1998)

Record labels established in 1980
Alternative rock record labels
Defunct record labels of the United States